Academic Pediatrics is a bimonthly peer-reviewed medical journal covering pediatrics. It was established in 2001 as Ambulatory Pediatrics, obtaining its current name in January 2009. 

It is published by Elsevier on behalf of the Academic Pediatric Association, of which it is the official journal. The editor-in-chief is Peter G. Szilagyi (University of Rochester), who replaced James M. Perrin (Harvard Medical School) in 2009. According to the Journal Citation Reports, the journal has a 2021 impact factor of 2.993.

References

External links

Pediatrics journals
Publications established in 2001
Elsevier academic journals
Academic journals associated with learned and professional societies of the United States
Bimonthly journals
English-language journals